Daniel Christopher Alaei (born 1982) is a professional poker player from Santa Fe Springs, California. He is of Assyrian descent.

Primarily a $50–100 no-limit Texas hold 'em cash game player, Alaei won his first World Series of Poker bracelet in 2006 in a no-limit 2-7 draw Lowball event. He was featured on the first three seasons of High Stakes Poker.

In 2007, Alaei cashed in the 2007 World Series of Poker Main Event, coming in a career-best 25th place out of a field of 6,358 players and winning $333,490. Alaei has two other Main Event cashes (59th in 2004 and 140th in 2005).

On December 19, 2009, he outlasted a field of 329 players to take down the WPT Doyle Brunson Five Diamond Classic, winning $1,428,430 in the process. He beat a final table that included poker professionals Scotty Nguyen and Josh Arieh, whom he defeated heads-up to win the tournament.

At the 2010 World Series of Poker, Alaei first finished 7th in the $50,000 Player's Championship Event for $221,105 before clinching his third WSOP bracelet when he defeated 345 players to win the $10,000 Pot Limit Omaha Championship for $780,599.

At the 2013 World Series of Poker, Alaei won his fourth WSOP bracelet when he won the $10,000 Pot Limit Omaha Championship for $852,692. He also cashed the $111,111 Big One for One Drop Super High Roller Event for $173,723.

At the 2015 World Series of Poker, Alaei won the $10,000 Omaha Hi-Lo 8 or Better Championship event for his fifth career bracelet and $391,097.

As of 2015, his total live tournament winnings exceed $6,800,000. His 20 cashes at the WSOP account for $2,535,621 of those winnings.

World Series of Poker Bracelets

Notes

1982 births
American poker players
World Series of Poker bracelet winners
World Poker Tour winners
American people of Iranian-Assyrian descent
People from Santa Fe Springs, California
Living people